Mia P. Manansala is a Filipino-American author known for her mystery fiction novels. Her debut novel  Arsenic and Adobo won her Agatha Award and Anthony Award in 2022.

Early life & education 

Manansala was born and grew up in Chicago.

She was raised in a household that was characterized by the presence of multiple generations, which consisted of her maternal grandparents, parents  Nilo and Marion, two younger brothers, and cousins.

she had spent several years teaching English in South Korea before returning home to Chicago.

In 2010, she graduated  from Northeastern Illinois University with a Bachelor of arts degree in English literature.

Career 
She wrote the first novel of a mystery series, but she was unsuccessful in finding a publisher. As a result,Manansala decided to start a new and write the first novel of the Tita Rosie's Kitchen series. She published her first novel Arsenic and Adobo, a first part of The Tita Rosie's Kitchen Mystery book series in 2021, it won Manansala 2022 Anthony Award and Agatha Award for “Best First Novel.

Her book series typically features amateur detectives solving crimes in small communities and center around the character Lila Macapagal, a baking enthusiast and Filipino woman who works to exonerate her loved ones from being falsely accused of wrongdoing in the fictional town of Shady Palms, located a short distance from Chicago.

Manansala's second novel Homicide and Halo-Halo of Tita Rosie’s Kitchen Mystery series deals with themes such as depression, PTSD, and harassment.

She also received Macavity award for Best First Mystery in 2022.

In 2022, she published Blackmail and Bibingka," the third installment in the Tita Rosie's Kitchen Mystery series.

In this novel she emphasis on character development and food descriptions than on the protagonist's detective work.

Bibliography

See also
Reader's Digest Select Editions

References 

Living people
American mystery writers
People from Chicago
Filipino American
Agatha Award winners
Anthony Award winners
Macavity Award winners